Bahar Shinwari (born 11 March 2001) is an Afghan cricketer. He made his first-class debut for Boost Region in the 2017–18 Ahmad Shah Abdali 4-day Tournament on 26 October 2017. He made his List A debut for Kabul Region in the 2018 Ghazi Amanullah Khan Regional One Day Tournament on 10 July 2018. He made his Twenty20 debut for Boost Defenders in the 2019 Shpageeza Cricket League on 10 October 2019.

References

External links
 

2001 births
Living people
Afghan cricketers
Boost Defenders cricketers
Kabul Eagles cricketers
Place of birth missing (living people)